Notocytharella striosa is a species of sea snail, a marine gastropod mollusk in the family Mangeliidae.

Description
The length of the shell varies between 6 mm and 8 mm.

The slender shell is dingy white, with a rather indistinct narrow central brown band on the body whorl. It contains 10-12 slender longitudinal ribs, crossed by close elevated revolving lines. The outer lip is rather sharp on the edge but thickened behind it by a stout rib.

Distribution
This marine species occurs off Baja California, Mexico.

References

External links
  Tucker, J.K. 2004 Catalog of recent and fossil turrids (Mollusca: Gastropoda). Zootaxa 682:1-1295.
 

striosa
Gastropods described in 1852